Anna-Maria Johansson (born 15 February 1982) is a Swedish handball player, who plays  for Skövde HF and the Swedish women's national handball team.

At the 2010 European Women's Handball Championship she reached the finals and won a silver medal with the Swedish team.

Achievements  
Carpathian Trophy: 
Winner: 2015

References

1982 births
Living people
Swedish female handball players
Handball players at the 2012 Summer Olympics
Olympic handball players of Sweden
21st-century Swedish women